The Miss Perú 1970 pageant was 15th edition of miss peru pageant  held on June 12, 1970. That year, 24 candidates were competing for the national crown. The chosen winner represented Peru at the Miss Universe 1970. The rest of the finalists would enter in different pageants.

Placements

Special Awards

 Best Regional Costume - Lambayeque - Olivia Avalos
 Miss Photogenic - Amazonas - María Arias
 Miss Elegance - Moquegua - Martha de la Jara
 Miss Body - Cuzco - Pocha Cárdenas
 Best Hair - Pasco - Ana María Landazuri
 Miss Congeniality - Ancash - María Inés Malpica
 Most Beautiful Face - Amazonas - María Arias

Delegates

Amazonas - María Arias
Áncash - María Inés Malpica
Apurímac - Celia Florian
Arequipa - Cristina Málaga Butrón
Ayacucho - Gloria Rivera Bedoya
Asia Perú - Yazmin Lau
Cajamarca - Monica Estrada
Cuzco - Pocha Cárdenas
Europe Perú - Isabel James Rossi
Huancavelica - Rebeca Arenas
Huánuco - Andrea Sierra
Ica - Tina Vargas Armandi

Junín - Mercedes Sanchez Mercado
Lambayeque - Olivia Avalos
Loreto - Cunny Ferreyros
Madre de Dios - Silvia Vasconcelos
Moquegua - Martha de la Jara
Pasco - Ana María Landazuri
Puno - Maria del Carmen Velando
Region Lima - Lucía Luna
San Martín - Rosa Barragán
Tacna - Gabriela Reyes Retana
Tumbes - Maria Luisa Zuniga
USA Perú - Adelaida 'Lala' Parker

References 

Miss Peru
1970 in Peru
1970 beauty pageants